Eduardo Antonio Solorza Ramirez (born January 17, 1993) is a Mexican professional boxer.

Professional career

Ramirez turned professional in 2010 and compiled a record of 25-2-3 before facing and defeating Isaac Avelar to win the interim featherweight title.

Professional boxing record

See also
List of world featherweight boxing champions

References

External links

 

|-

1993 births
Living people
Boxers from Sinaloa
Sportspeople from Los Mochis
Mexican male boxers
Super-bantamweight boxers
Featherweight boxers
Southpaw boxers